A by-election was held for the New South Wales Legislative Assembly electorate of Liverpool Plains on 9 January 1871 because Charles Cowper had been appointed Agent General in London.

Dates

Candidates
John Robertson was already a member of the Legislative Assembly, for the electorate West Sydney. At the nominations Hanley Bennett produced a telegram from Robertson stating that he would not oppose Lewis Levy and would not sit if elected.

Polling places

Polling was delayed at Breeza and Quirindi Inn because of floods and a mistake by a postmaster.

Result

Charles Cowper was appointed Agent General in London.

See also
Electoral results for the district of Liverpool Plains
List of New South Wales state by-elections

Notes

References

1871 elections in Australia
New South Wales state by-elections
1870s in New South Wales